Seth Moses (born August 2, 1993) is an American soccer player.

Club career
Moses signed for Austrian side SC Rheindorf Altach in 2011, and later joined Swiss side USV Eschen/Mauren. After the 2013 season in Switzerland, Moses returned to the United States for a short stint with USL PDL side Baltimore Bohemians and a trial with Seattle Sounders FC.

In 2014, Moses signed with USL Pro club Orange County Blues. He left at the end of their 2014 season to join K-League club FC Anyang.

Moses joined North American Soccer League side Puerto Rico FC on February 15, 2017. He was released at the end of the 2017 season due to natural disaster Hurricane Maria.

On February 9, 2018, Moses joined the Indy Eleven of the United Soccer League.

On March 6, 2019, Moses moved to USL Championship side Fresno FC. 

Moses joined Las Vegas Lights in August 2020.

On January 5, 2021, Moses moved to USL Championship side OKC Energy. Moses was released by OKC Energy on March 1, 2021.

References

External links

1993 births
Living people
American expatriate soccer players
SC Rheindorf Altach players
USV Eschen/Mauren players
American soccer players
Baltimore Bohemians players
Orange County SC players
FC Anyang players
Puerto Rico FC players
Indy Eleven players
Association football defenders
Soccer players from Maryland
Expatriate footballers in Austria
Expatriate footballers in Switzerland
USL Championship players
North American Soccer League players
Fresno FC players
Las Vegas Lights FC players
OKC Energy FC players